Karl Johan Magnus Ulveson (born 30 May 1954) is a Swedish actor and comedian. Most famous for appearing in Lorry, c/o Segemyhr and Parlamentet.

Ulveson grew up in Stockholm, graduated in Malmö and started his career at Norrbottensteatern in Luleå before his national breakthrough working with Povel Ramel in Affär Ramel. He voiced Calcifer in the Swedish dub of Howl's Moving Castle.

References

External links

Swedish male actors
Swedish male voice actors
Swedish comedians
Living people
1954 births